{{Album ratings
| 
| rev1 = Allmusic
| rev1Score = 
| rev2 = HipHopDX
| rev2Score = <ref name="HipHopDX">{{cite web|url=http://www.hiphopdx.com/index/reviews/id.1323/birdman-pricele|title='Priceless Review|publisher=HipHopDX|access-date=22 October 2011}}</ref>
| rev3 = Rolling Stone| rev3Score = 
| rev4 = The Smoking Section
| rev4Score = 
}}Priceless (stylized as Pricele$$'') is the fourth and final studio album by American rapper Birdman. The album was released on November 23, 2009. Producers included I.N.F.O., Oddz N Endz, Timbaland, Drumma Boy, T-Minus, and Infamous.

Singles
The first, and second most successful single off the album was "Always Strapped" featuring Lil Wayne. The remix was used for the video, and album featuring Mack Maine. The second single was "Written on Her" featuring Jay Sean, which in December 2009 significantly also became Birdman's first release in the UK. The third, and most successful single of Birdman's career as a lead artist peaking at number twenty-six on the Billboard Hot 100 was "Money to Blow", featuring Drake, and Lil Wayne. The fourth single from the album was "4 My Town (Play Ball)", also featuring Drake, and Lil Wayne.

Chart performance
The album debuted on the Billboard 200 chart at number thirty-three, selling 34,000 copies in its first week. It's his lowest charting album to date. The album has currently sold over 380,000 copies as of March 4, 2010.

Critical reception
William E. Ketchum III of HipHopDX.com said that Birdman constructs a disc full of capable singles, but not because of his own skills on the mic, but his producers and his guest stars. Calling the album "an album that's much more tolerable than Birdman detractors would expect or like to admit." He talked down to Birdman's rapping saying that "unlike other materialistic rhymers, Birdman doesn't have any redeeming qualities; he doesn't have the charisma of Lil Wayne, he doesn’t have the dry wit and wordplay of Fabolous, and he lacks the larger-than-life persona of Rick Ross. He furthly states that the uninventive rhymes and the unvarying subject matter take their toll. In conclusion, he stated that Birdman may not know how to rap well, but "by leading a team of capable emcees and beatmakers around him, he knows how to make music. And in this industry, that sixth sense of knowing what goes where is, well, priceless."

Track listing

Charts

Weekly charts

Year-end charts

References

2009 albums
Albums produced by Boi-1da
Albums produced by Drumma Boy
Albums produced by T-Minus (record producer)
Albums produced by T-Pain
Albums produced by Timbaland
Birdman (rapper) albums
Cash Money Records albums